Belfast Municipal Airport  is a public use airport in Waldo County, Maine, United States. It is owned by the City of Belfast and is located one nautical mile (1.85 km) southwest of its central business district.

Although most U.S. airports use the same three-letter location identifier for the FAA and IATA, this airport is assigned BST by the FAA but has no designation from the IATA (which assigned BST to Bost Airport in Lashkar Gah, Afghanistan).

Facilities and aircraft 
It has one runway designated 15/33 with an asphalt surface measuring 4,000 by 100 feet (1,219 x 30 m).

For the 12-month period ending August 9, 2008, the airport had 10,000 aircraft operations, an average of 27 per day: 80% general aviation and 20% air taxi. At that time there were 26 aircraft based at this airport: 88% single-engine, 8% helicopter and 4% ultralight.

References

External links 
 Aerial photo as of 9 May 1996 from USGS The National Map
 
 

Airports in Maine
Transportation buildings and structures in Waldo County, Maine
Buildings and structures in Belfast, Maine